The Dhua Kund are the pair of waterfalls situated in the city of Sasaram. These waterfalls have the capacity to generate 50-120 MW of hydroelectricity.

Festival

Every year on Raksha Bandhan, a festival is organized in the premises of these waterfalls.

Waterfalls of Bihar

References